The 1986 Paris–Nice was the 44th edition of the Paris–Nice road cycling stage race and was held from 2 March to 9 March 1986. The race started in Paris and finished at the Col d'Èze. The race was won by Sean Kelly of the Kas team.

Route

General classification

References

1986
1986 in road cycling
1986 in French sport
March 1986 sports events in Europe
1986 Super Prestige Pernod International